A hydrogen odorant in any form, is a minute amount of odorant such as ethyl isobutyrate, with a rotting-cabbage-like smell, that is added to the otherwise colorless and almost odorless hydrogen gas, so that leaks can be detected before a fire or explosion occurs.  Odorants are considered non-toxic in the extremely low concentrations occurring in hydrogen gas delivered to the end user.

The approach is not new, for the same safety reasons the odorant tert-butyl mercaptan is used in natural gas.

See also
Hydrogen safety
Odor detection threshold

External links
Odorant for hydrogen based on acrylate and acetophenone
Hydrogen Odorants and Odorant Selection Method
Hydrogen technologies